John J. Anderson (April 2, 1924 – March 15, 2001) was an American sprint canoer who competed in the early 1950s. He finished 14th in the K-2 10000 m event at the 1952 Summer Olympics in Helsinki.

References
Sports-reference.com profile

1924 births
2001 deaths
American male canoeists
Canoeists at the 1952 Summer Olympics
Olympic canoeists of the United States